Gessler Viera Abreu (born January 26, 1985) is a Cuban Taekwondo athlete. In 2007, he won the gold medal in featherweight (- 67 kg) at the World Taekwondo Championships in Beijing.

References
 Profile

Gessler Vierra Abreu is married to the  Mexican Olympic Medallist Iridia Salazar

Cuban male taekwondo practitioners
Taekwondo practitioners at the 2007 Pan American Games
Taekwondo practitioners at the 2008 Summer Olympics
Olympic taekwondo practitioners of Cuba
1985 births
Living people
World Taekwondo Championships medalists
Pan American Games competitors for Cuba
21st-century Cuban people